Kahone or Kawon is a town and commune near Kaolack, Senegal.  It is primarily agricultural, but it is participating in industrial development plans.  Also, the town is pursuing increased tourism based on its ancient Serer culture.

Kahone is the royal seat of the Serer Kingdom of Saloum which has ruled there since the 15th century after the Gelwar's defeat in c. 1335, and centuries previous to that. Kahone was originally a far more important town than Kaolack, but the roles have been reversed in recent years, and Kahone has been reduced to a sub-prefecture of Kaolack.  An annual royal festival is celebrated in which the O Maad (Serer king), Djaraaf (Serer prime minister) and other dignitaries meet to decide kingdom issues and hold pageants celebrating the history of Saloum and the Serer people.

There is a mosque thanks to the Wolof and Fula Muslim settlers and a Catholic missions in Kahone.  There are numerous ancient tombs, stone circles and megaliths in the vicinity as well as large burial mounds implanted with baobab trees.

Kahone is routinely involved in many administrative territorial disputes with neighboring communes, always emphasizing its earlier importance.

In 2007, according to official estimates, Kahone had 5,852 inhabitants.

Sources 
 Henry Gravrand, La civilisation sereer, I. Coosan, Dakar, Nouvelles Editions Africaines (1983). In French.
 Martin A. Klein, Islam and Imperialism in Senegal Sine-Saloum, 1847–1914, Edinburgh At the University Press (1968)
 Alioune Sarr, Histoire du Sine-Saloum. Introduction, bibliographie et Notes par Charles Becker, BIFAN, Tome 46, Serie B, n° 3–4, 1986-1987. In French.

See also 
 Kingdom of Saloum
 Kingdom of Sine
 Serer people

Populated places in Kaolack Region
Kaolack Region
Communes of Senegal